Ward's Stone is the highest hill in the Forest of Bowland, England. Its flat top hides two trig points nearly a kilometre apart. The western trig point sits atop of large rocks, including one, the Ward's Stone, that is so large it attracts boulderers and climbers.

The path from Grit Fell is difficult: crossing Cabin Flat, it weaves its way across hidden pools of stagnant water, the presence of which is betrayed by a form of red grass. White markers supposedly point out the way, but more often result in leading the walker astray. The second trig points faces the empty vastness of the eastern Forest of Bowland, with the summits of Wolfhole Crag, White Hill and the distant Ingleborough breaking the horizon. A second path approaches Ward's Stone from Tarnbrook, where limited parking is available.

On the southern slope of this hill are Thorn Crag, Hell Crag and Long Crag, rocky outcroppings that are popular with climbers. Within Thorn Crag, a shallow cave system exists that leads to Hell Crag; this route was first traversed by Lancaster University Mountaineering Club.

External links
 Computer generated summit panoramas Ward's Stone index

Marilyns of England
Hills of the Forest of Bowland
Mountains and hills of Lancashire
Geography of the City of Lancaster